Legal aid society may refer to:

 The Legal Aid Society in New York City
 Legal Aid Society of Cleveland
 Legal Aid Society of the District of Columbia

See also
 Legal aid, the concept
 Legal Services Society, British Columbia